Klášter Hradiště nad Jizerou is a municipality and village in Mladá Boleslav District in the Central Bohemian Region of the Czech Republic. It has about 1,000 inhabitants.

Geography
It lies mostly in the Jizera Table, but it also extends into the Jičín Uplands in the south. The municipality is situated on the rights bank of the Jizera River, which forms the eastern municipal border. The Zábrdka Stream flows through the village and joins the Jizera south of the village.

Economy

Klášter Hradiště nad Jizerou is known for the Klášter Brewery. The history of brewing beer in the village dates back to 1570.

Sights
The Gothic complex of the Cistercian monastery was built in the 12th century, built in was burned during the Hussite Wars in 1420. The ruins were rebuilt in the 16th century into a Renaissance castle. In the 19th century, the castle was converted into a brewery. It remains a cultural monument.

The Church of the Nativity of the Virgin Mary was built in the Renaissance style in 1560. In the 19th century, neo-Gothic tower was added.

References

External links

Villages in Mladá Boleslav District